Rampage may refer to:

People
 Rampage (rapper) (born 1974)
 Quinton Jackson (born 1978; nicknamed "Rampage"), American mixed martial artist and actor
 Randy Rampage (1960-2018), Canadian musician

Arts, entertainment, and media

Fictional characters
 Rampage (DC Comics), a supervillainess
 Rampage (Marvel Comics), a supervillain
 Rampage (Transformers), any of several characters in the Transformers universes
 Rampage, a character in the British web series Corner Shop Show
 Rampage, a character from the G.I. Joe: A Real American Hero franchise

Films
 Rampage (1963 film), an American adventure film
 Rampage (1986 film), a Turkish action film
 Rampage (1987 film), an American crime drama
 Rampage (2006 film), a documentary by George Gittoes
 Rampage (2009 film), a thriller by Uwe Boll
 Rampage (2018 film), a monster film inspired by the video game
 Rampage: The Hillside Strangler Murders, a 2006 direct-to-video film

Music
 "Rampage" (song), a 1991 single by EPMD and LL Cool J
 The Rampage, Japanese pop group

Video games
 Rampage (franchise), a video game franchise
 Rampage (video game), the first game in the Rampage series
 Rampage (2018 video game), based on the 2018 film

Other arts, entertainment, and media
 AEW Rampage, a professional wrestling television program
 "Rampage", an episode of CSI: Miamis fourth season
 "Rampage" (Star Wars: The Bad Batch), a 2021 episode
 Rampage, either of two  Marvel UK comics
 Terror in Meeple City, a board game formerly known as Rampage

Sports
 Rampage (mascot), the mascot of the NFL's Los Angeles Rams
 Grand Rapids Rampage, an Arena Football League team
 Red Bull Rampage, a mountain bike competition
 San Antonio Rampage, an ice hockey team
 Rampage (esports), former name of Japanese organisation Pentagram

Other uses
 Rampage Mountain, in Montana
 Rampage (roller coaster), located at Alabama Splash Adventure
 AST RAMpage, a computer memory expansion board and standard
 Dodge Rampage, a subcompact, unibody pickup truck
 Rampage, an air-launched version of the Israeli EXTRA artillery rocket system
 Rampage, a former US retail store now part of Charlotte Russe

See also
 Riot
 Running amok
 Spree killer